The Ambassador of Malaysia to the Kingdom of Thailand is the head of Malaysia's diplomatic mission to Thailand. The position has the rank and status of an Ambassador Extraordinary and Plenipotentiary and is based in the Embassy of Malaysia, Bangkok.

List of heads of mission

Ambassadors to Thailand

See also
 Malaysia–Thailand relations

References 

 
Thailand
Malaysia